Shark meat is a seafood consisting of the flesh of sharks. Several sharks are fished for human consumption, such as porbeagles, shortfin mako shark, requiem shark, and thresher shark, among others. Shark meat is popular in Asia, where it is often consumed dried, smoked, or salted. Shark meat is consumed regularly in Iceland, Japan, Australia, parts of India, parts of Canada, Sri Lanka, areas of Africa, Mexico and Yemen.

Sharks have been eaten at least since the Late Bronze Age (1550-1130 BC), for example in the Levant.

Preparation
Unprocessed shark meat may have a strong odor of ammonia, due to the high urea content that develops as the fish decomposes. The urea content and ammonia odor can be reduced by marinating the meat in liquids such as lemon juice, vinegar, milk, or saltwater. Preparation methods include slicing the meat into steaks and fillets.

Africa
In Eastern Africa and islands in the Indian Ocean, shark meat has been traded and has been a significant source of protein for centuries. Its consumption may occur primarily in coastal areas. It may be preserved using salt curing to extend its shelf life and to enable easier transportation.

Asia
Shark meat is common and popular in Asia. In 1999, the combined countries of Asia led in the number of sharks caught. Asian fisheries harvested 55.4% of the world's shark catch in 1996.

Japan
Japan has a large market share in the trade of frozen and fresh shark meat, for both importation and exportation. Shark meat is typically consumed in prepared forms in Japan, such as in prepared fish sausage, surimi, fish paste, fish balls, and other products.

Korea 

In Korea, dombaegi, salted shark meat, is eaten in North Gyeongsang Province, and it is considered to be a local food in Yeongcheon that is common in holidays.

Yemen 
In Yemen, shark meat known locally as Lakham (لخم), a dried salted shark meat is widely consumed in southern parts of Yemen especially in Hadhramout governance.

Australia 
Shark meat is popular in Australia, where it is known as flake. Flake is sourced primarily from gummy shark, a small, bottom-feeding species abundant along the east coast of Australia. However, due to the depletion of Australian and then New Zealand shark stocks, this demand is increasingly being filled by gummy sharks sourced from South Africa.  Flake can be purchased as a ready-made meal from most Australian fish and chip shops, usually in the form of battered or grilled fillets.

Europe
Per the Food and Agriculture Organization of the United Nations (FAO), European countries are major markets for shark meat. Pickled dogfish is popular food in Germany, France, and other northern European countries. The meat is typically processed and consumed in steaks and fillets. In Germany, though, a preference exists for backs, belly, and smoked belly flaps, which are referred to as Schillerlocken. Per the FAO, Italy led globally in the importation of shark meat in 1999, with France and Spain following. In 1999, France imported the second-largest amount of shark meat on a global level.

Small sharks are sold in Britain as rock salmon by fish and chips shops.

Iceland

In Iceland, hákarl is a national dish prepared using Greenland shark or sleeper shark. The shark meat is buried and fermented to cure it, and then hung to dry for several months.

Italy
In the island of Sardinia, the Burrida (a local version of Buridda) is a popular antipasto, made boiling usually a catshark (less commonly using a Common smooth-hound) on vinegar with onion and walnuts.
A similar dish also called Burrida is prepared in the Balearic islands of Spain with tunas instead of catsharks.

See also
 Bake and Shark
 Fermented fish
 List of fermented foods
 Shark fin soup
 Sharkfin and prawn dumpling in superior soup

References

External links 
 

Animal-based seafood
Commercial fish
Fish as food
Meat by animal
Seafood
Sharks